Rafael Calvo Serer (born 6 October 1916 at Valencia, Spain, died 19 April 1988 at Pamplona, Navarra, Spain) was a Professor of History of Spanish Philosophy, a writer, essayist. He was president of the Council of Administration of the newspaper Madrid, in which he published numerous articles on national and international politics. In 1949 he obtained the National Award for Literature for his work España sin problema.

His main works are: España sin problema (1949), El fin de la época de las revoluciones (1949), Teoría de la restauración (1952), La configuración del futuro (1953), Política de integración (1955), La aproximación de los neoliberales à la actitud tradicional (1956), La fuerza creadora de la libertad (1958), Nuevas formas democráticas de la libertad (1960), La literatura universal sobre la guerra de España (1962), La Política mundial de los Estados Unidos (1962), Las nuevas democracias (1964).

References
Diccionario Biográfico Español Contemporáneo, Círculo de Amigos de la Historia, Madrid 1970, vol. 1, p. 361.

External links
Rafael Calvo Serer in Proyecto Filosofía en español

1916 births
1988 deaths
Spanish essayists
Spanish male writers
Opus Dei members
Male essayists
20th-century essayists